is a 2006 Japanese-language American war film directed and co-produced by Clint Eastwood, starring Ken Watanabe and Kazunari Ninomiya. The film portrays the Battle of Iwo Jima from the perspective of the Japanese soldiers and is a companion piece to Eastwood's Flags of Our Fathers, which depicts the same battle from the American viewpoint; the two films were shot back to back. Letters from Iwo Jima is almost entirely in Japanese, despite being co-produced by American companies DreamWorks Pictures, Malpaso Productions and Amblin Entertainment.

The film was released in Japan on December 9, 2006 and received a limited release in the United States on December 20, 2006 in order to be eligible for consideration for the 79th Academy Awards, for which it received four nominations, including Best Picture and winning Best Sound Editing. It was subsequently released in more areas of the U.S. on January 12, 2007, and was released in most states on January 19. An English-dubbed version of the film premiered on April 7, 2008. Upon release, the film received critical acclaim and although it only grossed slightly better at the box office than its companion, it was much more successful compared to its budget.

Plot
In 2005, Japanese archaeologists explore tunnels on Iwo Jima, where they find something in the dirt.

Iwo Jima, 1944. Private First Class Saigo, a conscripted baker who misses his wife and daughter, is digging beach trenches with his platoon when Lieutenant General Tadamichi Kuribayashi arrives to take command of the garrison. He saves Saigo from a beating by Captain Tanida for being "unpatriotic", and orders the garrison to tunnel underground defenses throughout the island.

Kuribayashi and Lieutenant Colonel Baron Takeichi Nishi, a famous Olympic gold medalist show jumper, clash with the other officers, who disagree with Kuribayashi's defense in depth strategy. Kuribayashi learns that Japan cannot send reinforcements, and thus believes that the tunnels and mountain defenses stand a better chance for holding out. Poor nutrition and unsanitary conditions take their toll, and many die of dysentery. Replacement troops arrive, including Superior Private Shimizu, whom Saigo suspects is a spy from the Kempeitai sent to report on disloyal soldiers.

Soon, American aircraft and warships bombard the island. A few days later, U.S. Marines land and suffer heavy casualties, but they overcome the beach defenses and attack Mount Suribachi. While delivering a message from Captain Tanida, Saigo overhears Kuribayashi's retreat orders over the radio; Colonel Adachi begs him to authorize honorable suicide, which is denied. Adachi disobeys and authorizes mass suicide anyway. The entire unit dies, except Saigo and Shimizu, who decide to retreat and fight on.

The Mount Suribachi survivors make a run for friendly lines, but Marines ambush and wipe them out, except Saigo and Shimizu. The two reach safety, but are accused by Lieutenant Ito of cowardice. They are about to be summarily executed when Kuribayashi arrives and confirms his order to retreat. Against Kuribayashi's orders, Ito leads an attack on US positions and many soldiers are killed. Lt. Col. Nishi reprimands Ito for his insubordination; in response, Ito leaves carrying several land mines and intends to throw himself under a US tank. Shimizu reveals to Saigo that he was dishonorably discharged from the Kempeitai because he disobeyed an order to kill a family's dog. Nishi is eventually blinded by shrapnel, and orders his men to withdraw before committing suicide.

Saigo and Shimizu attempt to surrender, but are spotted by an officer, who is ordered to shoot potential deserters. Shimizu escapes, only to be found by a Marine patrol. Shimizu and another Japanese prisoner are then illegally shot dead by their guard. Saigo and the remaining soldiers flee to Kuribayashi's position, which is ill-supplied. Saigo befriends Kuribayashi, and a counter-attack is planned. Kuribayashi orders Saigo to stay behind and destroy any vital documents, saving his life for a third time.

That night, Kuribayashi leads a final banzai charge. Most of his men are killed, and Kuribayashi is critically wounded, but his loyal aide Lt. Fujita drags him away. Meanwhile, Ito has long abandoned his suicidal mission and is captured by Marines. The next morning, Kuribayashi orders Fujita to behead him with his Guntō, but Fujita is shot dead by a Marine sniper. Saigo arrives, having buried a bag of letters before leaving headquarters. Kuribayashi asks Saigo to bury him where he will not be found, then draws his pistol — an M1911 gifted to him in the US before the war — and commits suicide. Saigo dutifully buries him.

Later, a Marine platoon finds Fujita's body. Saigo reappears and attacks them, infuriated to see an American has taken Kuribayashi's pistol. Saigo is subdued and taken to the beach to recover alongside wounded Marines. Awakening on a stretcher, he glimpses the setting sun and smiles.

Returning to 2005, the archaeologists complete their digging and reveal the bag of letters that Saigo had buried. As the letters spill out from the opened bag, the voices of the Japanese soldiers who wrote them are heard.

Cast

 Ken Watanabe as General Tadamichi Kuribayashi
 Kazunari Ninomiya as Private First Class Saigo
 Tsuyoshi Ihara as Lieutenant Colonel Baron Takeichi Nishi
 Ryō Kase as Superior Private Shimizu
 Shidō Nakamura as Lieutenant Ito
 Hiroshi Watanabe as Lieutenant Fujita
 Takumi Bando as Captain Tanida
 Yuki Matsuzaki as Private First Class Nozaki
 Takashi Yamaguchi as Private First Class Kashiwara
 Eijiro Ozaki as Lieutenant Okubo
 Alan Sato as Sergeant Ondo
 Nae Yuuki as Hanako, Saigo's wife (in a flashback)
 Nobumasa Sakagami as Admiral Ohsugi
 Masashi Nagadoi as Admiral Ichimaru
 Akiko Shima as lead woman (in a flashback)
 Luke Eberl as Sam, wounded American Marine (credited as Lucas Elliot)
 Jeremy Glazer as American Marine Lieutenant
 Ikuma Ando as Ozawa
 Mark Moses as American officer (in a flashback)
 Roxanne Hart as Officer's wife
 Nori Bunasawa as Japanese Journalist

Production 

Although the film is set in Japan, it was filmed primarily in Barstow and Bakersfield in California. All Japanese cast except for Ken Watanabe were selected through auditions. Filming in California wrapped on April 8, and the cast and crew then headed back to the studio in Los Angeles for more scenes.

Ken Watanabe filmed a portion of his scenes on location on Iwo Jima. Locations on Iwo Jima which were used for filming included beaches, towns, and Mount Suribachi. Because the crew were only allowed to film minor scenes on Iwo Jima, most of the battle scenes were filmed in Iceland. Filming in Los Angeles lasted for approximately two months, and other locations across the US including Virginia, Chicago, and Houston.

The filmmakers had to be given special permission from the Tokyo Metropolitan Government to film on Iwo Jima, because more than 10,000 missing Japanese soldiers still rest under its soil. The Japan Maritime Self-Defense Force (JMSDF) operates a naval air base on Iwo Jima, which is used by the United States Navy for operations such as nighttime carrier landing practice. Civilian access to the island is restricted to those attending memorial services for fallen American Marines and Japanese soldiers.

The battleship , which was used in closeup shots of the fleet (for both movies), also participated in the actual attack on Iwo Jima for five days.  The only character to appear in both Flags of Our Fathers and Letters From Iwo Jima is Charles W. Lindberg, played by Alessandro Mastrobuono.

Sources 
The film is based on the non-fiction books "Gyokusai sōshikikan" no etegami ("Picture letters from the Commander in Chief") by General Tadamichi Kuribayashi (portrayed on screen by Ken Watanabe) and So Sad To Fall In Battle: An Account of War by Kumiko Kakehashi about the Battle of Iwo Jima. While some characters such as Saigo are fictional, the overall battle as well as several of the commanders are based upon actual people and events.

Reception

Critical response

In the United States
Letters from Iwo Jima was critically acclaimed, and well noted for its portrayal of good and evil on both sides of the battle. The critics heavily praised the writing, direction, cinematography and acting. The review tallying website Rotten Tomatoes reported that 184 out of the 202 reviews they tallied were positive for a score of 91%, and an average rating of 8.20/10, and a certification of "fresh." The site's consensus states: "A powerfully humanistic portrayal of the perils of war, this companion piece to Flags of Our Fathers is potent and thought-provoking, and it demonstrates Clint Eastwood's maturity as a director." Metacritic gave the movie a score of 89 based on 37 reviews, indicating "universal acclaim". Lisa Schwarzbaum of Entertainment Weekly, Kenneth Turan of the Los Angeles Times, and Richard Schickel of Time were among many critics to name it the best picture of the year. In addition, Peter Travers of Rolling Stone and Michael Phillips of the Chicago Tribune both gave it four stars, and Todd McCarthy of Variety praised the film, assigning it a rare 'A' rating.

On December 6, 2006, the National Board of Review of Motion Pictures named Letters from Iwo Jima the best film of 2006. On December 10, 2006, the Los Angeles Film Critics Association named Letters from Iwo Jima Best Picture of 2006. Furthermore, Clint Eastwood was runner-up for directing honors. In addition, the American Film Institute named it one of the 10 best films of 2006. It was also named Best Film in a Foreign Language on January 15 during the Golden Globe Awards, while Clint Eastwood held a nomination for Best Director.

CNNs Tom Charity in his review described Letters from Iwo Jima as "the only American movie of the year I won't hesitate to call a masterpiece." On the "Best Films of the Year 2006" broadcast (December 31, 2006) of the television show Ebert & Roeper, Richard Roeper listed the film at #3 and guest critic A. O. Scott listed it at number one, claiming that the film was "close to perfect". James Berardinelli awarded a three out of four star review, concluding that although both 'Letters' and 'Flags' were imperfect but interesting, 'Letters from Iwo Jima' was more focused, strong and straightforward than its companion piece.

On January 23, 2007, the film received four Academy Award nominations. Eastwood was nominated for his directing, as well as Best Picture along with producers Steven Spielberg and Robert Lorenz. It was also nominated for Best Original Screenplay. The film took home one award, Best Sound Editing.

The film appeared on many critics' top ten lists of the best films of 2006, including 157 top ten lists in North America with 25 number one spots.

In Japan
The film was far more commercially successful in Japan than in the U.S., ranking number 1 for five weeks, and receiving a warm reception from both Japanese audiences and critics. The Japanese critics noted that Clint Eastwood presented Kuribayashi as a "caring, erudite commander of Japan's Iwo Jima garrison, along with Japanese soldiers in general, in a sensitive, respectful way." Also, the Japanese newspaper Asahi Shimbun noted that the movie is clearly "distinguishable" from previous Hollywood movies, which tended to portray Japanese characters with non-Japanese actors (e.g., Chinese-Americans, and other Asian-Americans). Consequently, incorrect Japanese grammar and non-native accents were conspicuous in those former films, jarring their realism for the Japanese audience. In contrast, most Japanese roles in Letters from Iwo Jima are played by native Japanese actors. Also, the article praised the film's new approach, as it is scripted with excellent research into Japanese society at that time. According to the article, previous Hollywood movies describing Japan were based on the stereotypical images of Japanese society, which looked "weird" to native Japanese audiences. Letters from Iwo Jima is remarkable as the movie that tries to escape from the stereotypes. Owing to the lack of stereotypes, Letters from Iwo Jima was appreciated by Japanese critics and audiences.
 
Since the film was successful in Japan, a tourist boom has been reported on the Ogasawara islands, of which Iwo Jima is part.

Nicholas Barber's review in the UK's The Independent on Sunday, argued that the movie was "a traditional film wearing the uniform of a revisionist one" which proved Hollywood could be "as mawkish about other country's  soldiers as it can about its own", and that the Japanese characters were "capable of being decent, caring fellows, just so long as they've spent some time in the United States".

Despite favorable reviews, the film only grossed $13.7 million domestically in the United States. Foreign sales of $54.9 million helped to boost revenue over production costs of $19 million.

Awards and honors

Top ten lists

1st – A.O. Scott, The New York Times
1st – Claudia Puig, USA Today
1st – Kenneth Turan, Los Angeles Times (tied with Flags of our Fathers)
1st – Lisa Schwarzbaum, Entertainment Weekly
1st – Richard Schickel, TIME
1st – Mike McStay, Socius
2nd – Frank Scheck, The Hollywood Reporter
2nd – Kirk Honeycutt, The Hollywood Reporter
2nd – Manohla Dargis, The New York Times
2nd – Michael Wilmington, Chicago Tribune
2nd – Scott Foundas, LA Weekly (tied with Flags of our Fathers)
3rd – Jack Mathews, New York Daily News (tied with 'Flags of our Fathers)
3rd – Lou Lumenick, New York Post (tied with Flags of our Fathers)
3rd – Nathan Rabin, The A.V. Club
3rd – Peter Travers, Rolling Stone (tied with Flags of our Fathers)

3rd – Shawn Levy, The Oregonian (tied with Flags of our Fathers)
3rd – Richard Roeper, Chicago Sun-Times (tied with Flags of our Fathers)
4th – David Ansen, Newsweek
4th – Marjorie Baumgarten, The Austin Chronicle
5th – Michael Phillips, Chicago Tribune
5th – Michael Rechtshaffen, The Hollywood Reporter
5th – Stephen Holden, The New York Times
5th – Ty Burr, The Boston Globe
6th – Keith Phipps, The A.V. Club
9th – Rene Rodriguez, The Miami Herald
General top ten
Carrie Rickey, The Philadelphia Inquirer
Joe Morgenstern, The Wall Street Journal
Peter Rainer, The Christian Science Monitor
Steven Rea, The Philadelphia Inquirer

Other honors
The film is recognized by American Film Institute in these lists:
 2008: AFI's 10 Top 10:
 Nominated Epic Film

Home media
Letters from Iwo Jima was released on DVD by Warner Home Video on May 22, 2007. It was also released on HD DVD and Blu-ray Disc. Furthermore, it was made available for instant viewing with Netflix's "Watch Instantly" feature where available. The film was re-released in 2010 as part of Clint Eastwood's tribute collection Clint Eastwood: 35 Films 35 Years at Warner Bros.
The Two-Disc Special Collector's Edition DVD is also available in a Five-Disc Commemorative Set, which also includes the Two-Disc Special Collector's Edition of Flags of Our Fathers and a bonus fifth disc containing History Channel's "Heroes of Iwo Jima" documentary and To the Shores of Iwo Jima, a documentary produced by the U.S. Navy and Marine Corps.

The English dubbed version DVD was released on June 1, 2010. This version was first aired on cable channel AMC on April 26, 2008.

References

Further reading

External links

 
 
 
 
 
 Video interview with Letters from Iwo Jima special effects artist Vincent Guastini  at Interviewing Hollywood
 
 

2006 films
2000s Japanese-language films
2006 drama films
2000s war films
American war drama films
Japanese war drama films
Battle of Iwo Jima films
Pacific War films
Best Foreign Language Film Golden Globe winners
Films based on multiple works
Films directed by Clint Eastwood
Films produced by Clint Eastwood
Films produced by Robert Lorenz
Films produced by Steven Spielberg
Films set in Okinawa Prefecture
Films set in the 1940s
Films set in 2005
Films shot in Chicago
Films shot in Houston
Films shot in Iceland
Films shot in Los Angeles
Films shot in Tokyo
Films shot in Virginia
Films that won the Best Sound Editing Academy Award
Films with screenplays by Paul Haggis
Films about the United States Marine Corps
Amblin Entertainment films
Malpaso Productions films
DreamWorks Pictures films
Warner Bros. films
Japan in non-Japanese culture
American World War II films
2000s American films